A hard copy is a permanent reproduction, or copy, in the form of a physical object.

It may also refer to:
 Hard Copy (TV program), an American tabloid television show that ran from 1989 to 1999
 Hard Copy, a drama that was part of the 1987 American television season
 Hard Copy (South Africa TV), a South African television drama series that ran from 2005 to 2016
 The Hard Copy Observer, a defunct publication about the printing and imaging business
 Hard-copy terminal, an early type of computer terminal that printed text instead of displaying it on a screen
 Hardcopy (magazine), a defunct computer trade magazine